Central committee is the common designation of a standing administrative body of communist parties, analogous to a board of directors, of both ruling and nonruling parties of former and existing socialist states. In such party organizations, the committee would typically be made up of delegates elected at a party congress. In those states where it constituted the state power, the central committee made decisions for the party between congresses and usually was (at least nominally) responsible for electing the politburo. In non-ruling communist parties, the central committee is usually understood by the party membership to be the ultimate decision-making authority between congresses once the process of democratic centralism has led to an agreed-upon position.

Non-communist organizations are also governed by central committees, such as the right-wing Likud party in Israel, the North American Mennonite Church and Alcoholics Anonymous, the Chinese Kuomintang as well as the former American Central Committee for Conscientious Objectors. In the United States, the two major parties are administered by the Democratic National Committee and the Republican National Committee; these act as the leading bodies of those organizations at the national/administrative level as well as local committees in a similar capacity within the local Democratic or Republican governments of individual counties and states.

List of central committees

Communist
 Central Committee of the People's Democratic Party of Afghanistan
 Central Committee of the Party of Labor of Albania
 Central Committee of the Azerbaijani Democratic Party
 Central Committee of the People's Revolutionary Party of Benin
 Central Committee of the Bulgarian Communist Party
Central Committee of the Communist Party of Canada
 Central Committee of the Chinese Communist Party
 Central Committee of the Communist Party of Cuba
 Central Committee of the Communist Party of Czechoslovakia
 Central Committee of the Workers' Party of Ethiopia
 Central Committee of the Socialist Unity Party of Germany
 Central Committee of the Communist Party of Greece
Central Committee of the Hungarian Socialist Workers' Party
 Central Committee of the Communist Party of India
 Central Committee of the Communist Party of India (Maoist)
 Central Committee of the Communist Party of India (Marxist)
 Central Committee of the Italian Communist Party
 Central Committee of the Japan Communist Party
 Central Committee of the Communist Party of Kampuchea
 Central Committee of the Lao People's Revolutionary Party
 Central Committee of the Communist Party of Nepal (Maoist Centre)
 Central Committee of the Communist Party of Nepal (Unified Marxist–Leninist)
Central Committee of the Communist Party of Nepal (Unified Socialist)
 Central Committee of the Democratic Front for the Liberation of Palestine
 Central Committee of the Popular Front for the Liberation of Palestine
 Central Committee of the Communist Party of the Philippines
 Central Committee of the Polish United Workers' Party
 Central Committee of the Portuguese Communist Party
 Central Committee of the Communist Party of the Russian Federation
 Central Committee of the Romanian Communist Party
 Central Committee of the Sammarinese Communist Party
 Central Committee of the South African Communist Party
 Central Committee of the Communist Party of the Soviet Union
 Central Committee of the Communist Party of Armenia
 Central Committee of the Azerbaijan Communist Party
 Central Committee of the Communist Party of Byelorussia
 Central Committee of the Communist Party of Estonia
 Central Committee of the Communist Party of Georgia
 Central Committee of the Communist Party of Kazakhstan
 Central Committee of the Communist Party of Kirghizia
 Central Committee of the Communist Party of Latvia
 Central Committee of the Communist Party of Lithuania
 Central Committee of the Communist Party of Moldavia
 Central Committee of the Communist Party of Tajikistan
 Central Committee of the Communist Party of Turkmenistan
 Central Committee of the Communist Party of Ukraine
 Central Committee of the Communist Party of Uzbekistan
 Central Committee of the Tuvan People's Revolutionary Party
 Central Committee of the Workers' Party of Korea
 Central Committee of the Communist Party of Vietnam
 Central Committee of the United Wa State Party
 Central Committee of the League of Communists of Yugoslavia
 Central Committee of the League of Communists of Bosnia and Herzegovina
 Central Committee of the League of Communists of Croatia
 Central Committee of the League of Communists of Macedonia
 Central Committee of the League of Communists of Montenegro
 Central Committee of the League of Communists of Serbia
 Central Committee of the League of Communists of Vojvodina
 Central Committee of the League of Communists of Kosovo
 Central Committee of the League of Communists of Slovenia

Non-communist
 Central Committee of the Arab Socialist Ba'ath party - Syria Region (neo-Baathism and pan-Arabism)
 Central Committee of the Chama Cha Mapinduzi (african socialism and african nationalism)
 Central Committee of Fatah (social democracy and democratic socialism)
 Central Committee of the Kuomintang (Three Principles of the People, conservatism and Chinese nationalism)
Central Committee of the Left (democratic socialism)
Central Committee of the Likud (national liberalism and liberal conservatism)
 Central Committee of PAIGC (social democracy and democratic socialism)
 Central Committee of the Pakistan Peoples Party (social democracy and democratic socialism)
 Central Committee of the People's Progressive Party/Civic (social democracy, democratic socialism and left-wing nationalism)

Formerly communist
 Central Committee of the Cambodian People's Party (conservatism and economic liberalism since 1991)
 Central Committee of the Congolese Party of Labour (social democracy and democratic socialism since 2006)
Central Committee of FRELIMO (social democracy and democratic socialism since 1989)
 Central Committee of the Mongolian People's Party (social democracy and democratic socialism since 1990)
 Central Committee of the MPLA (social democracy and democratic socialism since 1990)
 Central Committee of SWAPO (social democracy and democratic socialism since 1990, Socialism with Namibian characteristics since 2017)
 Central Committee of the Yemeni Socialist Party (social democracy and Arab nationalism since 1990)

See also 

 Eastern Bloc politics
 Politburo

References 

Communist parties
Communist terminology
Executive committees of political parties